Sheykh Mahalleh (also Romanized as Sheykh Maḩalleh) is a village in Esbu Kola Rural District, in the Central District of Babol County, Mazandaran Province, Iran. At the 2006 census, its population was 281, in 77 families.

References 

Populated places in Babol County